Roxbury High School may refer to:
 Roxbury High School (New Jersey), Roxbury Township, New Jersey, United States
 Roxbury Memorial High School (1926–1959), Boston, Massachusetts, United States
 Roxbury High School (1959–1974), Boston, Massachusetts, a target of compulsory busing in the Boston busing crisis